Netzone, stylized as NET:Zone, is a computer game developed by Compro Games and published by GameTek in 1996 for the PC. It is a cyberpunk, puzzle, click adventure game wherein the player explores a 3D cyberspace environment created by a company named Cycorp.

Reviews

References

1996 video games
Windows games
DOS games
Cyberpunk video games
Video games developed in Israel
GameTek games
Single-player video games